Andi Soraya (born 18 June 1976) is an Indonesian actress. She became known to the public after starring the RCTI soap opera Air Mata Terakhir.

Career 
Soraya began her career by modelling in advertisements for clients such as Prenagen, B-29, Vegeta, Bank Mandiri, and Hit. She was cast in the Indonesian soap opera Air Mata Terakhir on the RCTI network. In 2008, she appeared in the film Anda Puas, Saya Loyo.

In 2008, she appeared in the suspense mystery Hantu Aborsi and the comedy Kutunggu Jandamu with Dewi Persik. She was in the films Hantu Puncak Datang Bulan and  Arisan Brondong with Ferly Putra in 2010. She sang and produced the  song Terpisahkan from the film Pengakuan Seorang Pelacur. She also had the lead role in the film.

Personal life 
Soraya has Arab, Cirebon and Bugis blood, where her father was Andi Zen Assegaf was an Arab-descent and mother was Laela. Soraya has three siblings: Andi Mohammad Noor Assegaf (older brother), Andi Suzie (older sister) and Andi Jihan (younger sister).

She married Ahmad Kurnia Wibawa in 1997. They divorced in 2000. She was in a relationship with actor Steve Emmanuel, and they have one child. On 18 November 2011, she married again, with Rudi Sutopo, an oil businessman. They divorced in October 2015.

Filmography

Film

Television

TV advertisement 
 Prenagen
 B-29
 Vegeta
 Bank Mandiri
 Hit

References

External links 
 

1976 births
Actresses from Jakarta
Living people
Bugis people
Indonesian people of Yemeni descent